Spiral, released in 2010 is the sixth studio album from musician Allison Crowe and the first to include strings and orchestration in addition to band elements. Tracks for this album were recorded in a range of locations across Canada and Europe, including Crowe's home-bases of Nanaimo, British Columbia and Corner Brook, Newfoundland as well as Vienna, Austria and on Salt Spring Island, Canada.

Kayla Schmah, a Los Angeles-based, Canadian-born, composer and film scorer, arranged and orchestrated the album's string sections and served as over-all producer.

Spiral is a collection of original songs composed by Allison Crowe on piano and guitar, alongside interpretations of several songs popular in different parts of the world: Throw Your Arms Around Me by Australia's Hunters and Collectors; Why from the United Kingdom's Annie Lennox; and, from her home country, Chelsea Hotel No. 2, the latest of several Leonard Cohen songs covered by Crowe.

Stephen Thomas, co-founder of UK-based Folkroom Records, writing for music blog ‘We Write Lists’ named "Spiral" one of "The Twelve Most Exciting Albums of 2010", remarking: "Crowe's speciality is startlingly beautiful piano-based songs that sort of make you wonder why you bother with anything else."

Track listing
Dearly (Allison Crowe) – 4:09
Double-Edged Swords (Allison Crowe) – 2:32
"Chelsea Hotel No. 2" (Leonard Cohen) – 4:29
Wake Up (live) (Allison Crowe) – 5:35
Oceans (Allison Crowe) – 3:13
I Don't Know (Allison Crowe) – 4:48
Spiral (Allison Crowe) – 3:45
Throw Your Arms Around Me (John Archer, Geoffrey Crosby, Douglas Falconer, John Howard, Robert Miles, Mark Seymour, Michael Waters) – 4:24
Why (Annie Lennox) – 4:40
Going Home Tonight (Allison Crowe) – 4:42
No Matter the Battle (Allison Crowe) – 4:10
silence (82 seconds of) – 01:22
"Throw Your Arms Around Me v2" (John Archer, Geoffrey Crosby, Douglas Falconer, John Howard, Robert Miles, Mark Seymour, Michael Waters) – 4:24
Why v2 (Annie Lennox) – 4:42

Personnel
Allison Crowe – vocals, piano, guitar
Billie Woods – acoustic guitar, vocals
Larry Anschell – electric guitar
Dave Baird – electric bass, vocals
Laurent Boucher – percussion
Brendan Millbank – cello

Production
Production: Kayla Schmah & Allison Crowe
Strings, Orchestral Arrangements: Kayla Schmah
Engineer: Allison Crowe & Larry Anschell
Live Recording Engineers: John MacMillan and Condor
Art Direction: Alix Whitmire
Original paintings: Tara Thelen

References

External links
Allison Crowe official site
Spiral reviews

Allison Crowe albums
2010 albums